Gyrostoma may refer to:
 Gyrostoma (cnidarian), a genus of cnidarians in the family Actiniidae
 Polistes (Gyrostoma), a subgenus of wasps in the genus Polistes, in the family Vespidae
 Gyrostoma, a genus of gastropods in the family Pleuroceridae, synonym of Gyrotoma